The fringe-toed velvet gecko (Oedura filicipoda) is a gecko endemic to Western Australia.

References

Oedura
Reptiles described in 1985
Taxa named by Max King (herpetologist)
Reptiles of Western Australia
Geckos of Australia